Lubomirskiidae is a family of freshwater sponges from Lake Baikal in Russia.

Lubomirskia baikalensis, Baikalospongia bacillifera and B. intermedia are unusually large for freshwater sponges and can reach  or more. These three are also the most common sponges in Lake Baikal. Most sponges in the lake are typically green when alive because of symbiotic dinoflagellates (zoochlorella), but can also be brownish or yellowish.

Genera and species
The family contains four genera and sixteen species:

 Genus Baikalospongia Annandale, 1914
 Baikalospongia abyssalis Itskovich, Kaluzhnaya, Veynberg & Erpenbeck, 2017
 Baikalospongia bacillifera Dybowsky, 1880
 Baikalospongia dzhegatajensis Rezvoi, 1927
 Baikalospongia fungiformis Makushok, 1927
 Baikalospongia intermedia Dybowsky, 1880
 Baikalospongia martinsoni Efremova, 2004
 Baikalospongia recta Efremova, 2004
 Genus Lubomirskia Dybowsky, 1880
 Lubomirskia abietina Swartschewsky, 1901
 Lubomirskia baikalensis (Pallas, 1773)
 Lubomirskia fusifera Soukatschoff, 1895
 Lubomirskia incrustans Efremova, 2004
 Genus Rezinkovia Efremova, 2004
 Rezinkovia arbuscula Efremova, 2004
 Rezinkovia echinata Efremova, 2004
 Genus Swartschewskia Makuschok, 1927
 Swartschewskia irregularis Swartschewsky, 1902
 Swartschewskia khanaevi Bukshuk & Maikova, 2020
 Swartschewskia papyracea (Dybowsky, 1880)

References

Sponge families
Heteroscleromorpha
Fauna of Lake Baikal